Sainte-Blandine is the name of two communes in France, named for Blandina, virgin and martyr:

 Sainte-Blandine, Isère, in the Isère département
 Sainte-Blandine, Deux-Sèvres, in the Deux-Sèvres département